Pentaplatarthus is a genus of beetles in the family Carabidae, containing the following species:

 Pentaplatarthrus schoutedeni Reichensperger, 1925 
 Pentaplatarthrus bottegi Gestro, 1895 
 Pentaplatarthrus dollmanni Wasmann, 1922 
 Pentaplatarthrus focki Wasmann, 1919 
 Pentaplatarthrus gestroi H.Kolbe, 1896 
 Pentaplatarthrus natalensis Westwood, 1850 
 Pentaplatarthrus paussoides Westwood, 1833 
 Pentaplatarthrus vandamii Van De Poll, 1886 

These are Ant nest beetles and are obligate myrmecophiles predatory on ant larvae and workers.

References

Paussinae